The 2011 CAF Champions League knock-out stage matches took place between September and November 2011. The matchdays were: 30 September–2 October (semifinals first leg), 14–16 October (semifinals second leg), 4–6 November (final first leg), 11–13 November (final second leg).

All knock-out ties were decided over two legs, with aggregate goals used to determine the winner. If the sides were level on aggregate after the second leg, the away goals rule applied, and if still level, the tie proceeded directly to a penalty shootout (no extra time is played).

Qualified teams
The knock-out stage featured four teams: the two group winners and the two group runners-up from the group stage. In the semi-finals, the group A winners played the group B runners-up, and the group B winners played the group A runners-up. In both ties, the group winners hosted the second leg at home.

Semifinals

Wydad AC won 1–0 on aggregate and advanced to the 2011 CAF Champions League Final.

Espérance ST won 3–0 on aggregate and advanced to the 2011 CAF Champions League Final.

Final

Espérance ST won 1–0 on aggregate.

References

External links
CAF Champions League

Knock-out Stage